Imperatore is a surname. Notable people with the surname include:

Arthur Imperatore Sr. (1925–2020), American businessman
Salvador Imperatore (born 1950), Chilean football referee

It is also a nickname. Notable people with the nickname include:
Adriano Leite Ribeiro (born 1982), Brazilian footballer

See also 
Campo Imperatore